Winston Griffiths (12 September 1978 – 23 October 2011) was a Jamaican footballer who played in the USL A-League, Jamaica National Premier League, Major League Soccer, South Central Confederation Super League, and the Canadian Soccer League. He also appeared for the Jamaica national football team, and represented his country in the 1998, and 2000 CONCACAF Gold Cup tournaments.

Club career

College
After leaving Jamaica's Glenmuir High, Griffiths played college soccer at the University of Rhode Island from 1998 to 1999, leading the team to the Atlantic-10 Conference regular season and tournament championships in 1999. He finished his career at URI with 42 points.

Professional
Nicknamed Fanna, he began his professional career with the Connecticut Wolves of the A-League. He returned to his native Jamaica to play for Galaxy FC, but his team was relegated from the Jamaica National Premier League. When the season ended he had an unsuccessful trial with Bolton Wanderers. In 2002, Griffiths was drafted by Dallas Burn of the Major League Soccer, but was traded to the MetroStars in exchange for D.J. Countess before the start of season. He made his debut on 23 March 2002 against New England Revolution. On 20 April 2002 he was traded to the Los Angeles Galaxy for a conditional SuperDraft pick, and appeared in six matches and recorded one goal.

He was waived from the roster and on 30 July 2002 he was signed by the New England Revolution. For the remainder of the season he helped New England secure the Eastern Conference title. He featured in the MLS Cup final against his former club the LA Galaxy where he nearly scored the match winner at the 112' minute to only hit the crossbar and allow the Galaxy to recover and record the winning goal a minute later. The following season he returned to Jamaica to play with Portmore United, where he won the league title and the JFF Champions Cup.

In 2004, he went abroad once more to return to the USL A-League to be signed by the Vancouver Whitecaps.  Throughout his time in Vancouver he recorded two goals and five assists, and reached the Western Conference Finals. He returned home in 2005 to play with Arnett Gardens F.C., and returned to Canada on a loan to the Toronto Lynx. He made his debut on 30 April 2005 against Richmond Kickers. He recorded his first goal the following match in a 1–1 draw to the Virginia Beach Mariners.

In 2007, he had a third stint in Canada where he played with Portuguese Supra of the Canadian Soccer League. He made his debut for the club on 12 July 2007 in an Open Canada Cup match against the Canadian Lions. On 15 July 2007 he recorded a hat-trick in a 5–2 victory over the Lions. After a brief tenure with Supra he returned home to play in the South Central Confederation Super League with Sporting Central Academy, and secured a league title and promotion to the premier league. After a two-year absence from football he returned to the CSL in 2010 after London City signed him to a contract from a recommendation from former teammate Rick Titus. On 2 July 2010 he returned home in order to sort personal matters out. He finished off his career with Humble Lions F.C. in the premier league.

International career
Griffiths made his debut for Jamaica in 1998 against Guatemala, and made his last international was in 2002 against Barbados, having played 28 times and scored twice for the Reggae Boyz. He scored his first international goal on 5 June 1999 in the 1999 Caribbean Cup against Guadeloupe. He featured in the 1998, and 2000 CONCACAF Gold Cup tournaments. Griffiths also played for Jamaica at the 1999 Pan American Games, scoring a goal versus Honduras in a 1–2 defeat.

Death
On Sunday 23 October 2011, Griffiths was found in odd circumstances and later died in May Pen hospital, he was 33.

Honours 
New England Revolution
Eastern Conference (1):2002
Portmore United F.C.
National Premier League (1): 2004–05
JFF Champions Cup (1): 2004–05
Sporting Central Academy
South Central Confederation Super League (1):2007

References

External links
Profile of Winston Griffiths
Goodbye 'Fanna'... former Reggae Boy passes on Jamaica Star

1978 births
2011 deaths
Canadian Soccer League (1998–present) players
Connecticut Wolves players
Expatriate soccer players in Canada
Expatriate soccer players in the United States
Jamaica international footballers
Jamaican expatriate footballers
Jamaican expatriate sportspeople in Canada
Jamaican expatriate sportspeople in the United States
Jamaican footballers
LA Galaxy players
London City players
Major League Soccer players
New England Revolution players
New York Red Bulls players
People from Clarendon Parish, Jamaica
Portmore United F.C. players
Toronto Lynx players
USL First Division players
Vancouver Whitecaps (1986–2010) players
Arnett Gardens F.C. players
SC Toronto players
Sporting Central Academy players
A-League (1995–2004) players
Rhode Island Rams men's soccer players
Humble Lions F.C. players
Pan American Games competitors for Jamaica
Footballers at the 1999 Pan American Games
1998 CONCACAF Gold Cup players
2000 CONCACAF Gold Cup players
Association football midfielders
National Premier League players